In general, detection is the action of accessing information without specific cooperation from  with the sender.

In the history of radio communications, the term "detector" was first used for a device that detected the simple presence or absence of a radio signal, since all communications were in Morse code.  The term is still in use today to describe a component that extracts a particular signal from all of the electromagnetic waves present.  Detection is usually based on the frequency of the carrier signal, as in the familiar frequencies of radio broadcasting, but it may also involve filtering a faint signal from noise, as in radio astronomy, or reconstructing a hidden signal, as in steganography.

In optoelectronics, "detection" means converting a received optical input to an electrical output. For example, the light signal received through an optical fiber is converted to an electrical signal in a detector such as a photodiode.

In steganography, attempts to detect hidden signals in suspected carrier material is referred to as steganalysis.  Steganalysis has an interesting difference from most other types of detection, in that it can often only determine the probability that a hidden message exists; this is in contrast to the detection of signals which are simply encrypted, as the ciphertext can often be identified with certainty, even if it cannot be decoded. 

In the military, detection refers to the special discipline of reconnaissance with the aim to recognize the presence of an object in a location or ambiance.

Finally, the art of detection, also known as following clues, is the work of a detective in attempting to reconstruct a sequence of events by identifying the relevant information in a situation.

See also
 Object detection
 Signal detection theory

Communication
Wireless locating